A643 may refer to:

 A643 road, a road in England
 Bundesautobahn 643, a road in Germany